The list of New Brunswick by-elections includes every by-election held in the Canadian province of New Brunswick. By-elections occur whenever there is a vacancy in the Legislative Assembly, although an imminent general election may allow the vacancy to remain until the dissolution of parliament. Between 1842 and 1927 incumbent members were required to recontest their seats upon being appointed to Cabinet. These Ministerial by-elections were almost always uncontested.

60th New Brunswick Legislature 2020–present

59th New Brunswick Legislature 2018–2020
No by-elections were held during the 59th New Brunswick Legislature's term.

58th New Brunswick Legislature 2014–2018

57th New Brunswick Legislature 2010–2014

56th New Brunswick Legislature 2006–2010

55th New Brunswick Legislature 2003–2006

54th New Brunswick Legislature 1999–2003

53rd New Brunswick Legislature 1995–1999

52nd New Brunswick Legislature 1991–1995

51st New Brunswick Legislature 1987–1991

50th New Brunswick Legislature 1982–1987

49th New Brunswick Legislature 1978–1982

48th New Brunswick Legislature 1974–1978

47th New Brunswick Legislature 1970–1974

46th New Brunswick Legislature 1967–1970

45th New Brunswick Legislature 1963–1967

44th New Brunswick Legislature 1960–1963

43rd New Brunswick Legislature 1956–1960
no by-elections

42nd New Brunswick Legislature 1952–1956
no by-elections

41st New Brunswick Legislature 1948–1952

40th New Brunswick Legislature 1944–1948

† Won by acclamation

39th New Brunswick Legislature 1939–1944

† Won by acclamation

38th New Brunswick Legislature 1935–1939
no by-elections

37th New Brunswick Legislature 1930–1935

† Won by acclamation

36th New Brunswick Legislature 1925–1930

† Won by acclamation

35th New Brunswick Legislature 1920–1925

† Won by acclamation

34th New Brunswick Legislature 1917–1920

† Won by acclamation

33rd New Brunswick Legislature 1912–1917

† Won by acclamation

32nd New Brunswick Legislature 1908–1912

† Won by acclamation

31st New Brunswick Legislature 1903–1908

† Won by acclamation

30th New Brunswick Legislature 1899–1903

† Won by acclamation

29th New Brunswick Legislature 1895–1899

† Won by acclamation

28th New Brunswick Legislature 1892–1895

† Won by acclamation

27th New Brunswick Legislature 1890–1892

26th New Brunswick Legislature 1886–1890

† Won by acclamation

25th New Brunswick Legislature 1882–1886

† Won by acclamation

24th New Brunswick Legislature 1878–1882

† Won by acclamation

23rd New Brunswick Legislature 1874–1878

† Won by acclamation

22nd New Brunswick Legislature 1870–1874

† Won by acclamation

21st New Brunswick Legislature 1866–1870

† Won by acclamation

20th New Brunswick Legislature 1865–1866

† Won by acclamation

19th New Brunswick Legislature 1861–1865

† Won by acclamation

18th New Brunswick Legislature 1857–1861

† Won by acclamation

17th New Brunswick Legislature 1856–1857

† Won by acclamation

16th New Brunswick Legislature 1854–1856

† Won by acclamation

15th New Brunswick Legislature 1850–1854

† Won by acclamation

14th New Brunswick Legislature 1846–1850

13th New Brunswick Legislature 1843–1846

† Won by acclamation

12th New Brunswick Legislature 1837–1842

† Won by acclamation

11th New Brunswick Legislature 1835–1837

10th New Brunswick Legislature 1830–1834

† Won by acclamation

9th New Brunswick Legislature 1827–1830

8th New Brunswick Legislature 1820–1827

† Won by acclamation

7th New Brunswick Legislature 1819–1820
no by-elections

6th New Brunswick Legislature 1816–1819

5th New Brunswick Legislature 1809–1816

† Won by acclamation

4th New Brunswick Legislature 1802–1809

3rd New Brunswick Legislature 1795–1802

2nd New Brunswick Legislature 1793–1795
no by-elections held

1st New Brunswick Legislature 1785–1792

See also
 List of federal by-elections in Canada

References

 New Brunswick Elections Database, The Legislative Library of New Brunswick
 Elections in New Brunswick, 1784-1984 = Les élections au Nouveau-Brunswick, 1784-1984. Fredericton, N.B. : New Brunswick Legislative Library, 1984.

Provincial by-elections in New Brunswick
Elections, by-elections
New Brunswick, by-ele